Nguyễn Đình Bảo (born 19 May 1991) is a Vietnamese footballer who plays as a forward for Quảng Nam.

References

1991 births
Living people
Vietnamese footballers
Song Lam Nghe An FC players
Haiphong FC players
Thanh Hóa FC players
Quang Nam FC players
V.League 1 players
People from Nghệ An province
Association football forwards